Balan Nambiar (born 12 November, 1937 in Kannapuram) is an Indian painter, sculptor, enamellist, photographer and an academic researcher.

Biography

As a sculptor he worked with clay, fiberglass reinforced concrete, wood, bronze, mild steel and, from 2000, stainless steel. Many of his works are outdoor sculptures; some are monumental.
He produced enamel paintings, having learned the technique from Paolo De Poli of Padua, Italy. His creative works were exhibited in national and international art exhibitions, including Venice Biennale in 1982, Constructa-78 in Hannover in 1978, Triennale India in New Delhi in 1975. Works by him are in the permanent collection of many museums.

Balan Nambiar has extensively studied, photographed and documented hundreds of ritual performances and art forms of the Indian west coast as Teyyam and Bhuta. Articles and photographs by him are published in books. Around 1800 of his photographs have been acquired by the Indira Gandhi National Centre for Arts, New Delhi. 

He received awards both for creative works and academic research: India National Award in 1981 and Karnataka State Award in 1980 of Lalit Kala Academy (National Academy of Fine Arts) for his sculptures, Senior Fellowship of the India Ministry of Culture in 1982–83 and Nehru Fellowship of Jawaharlal Nehru Memorial Fund in 1983–85 for academic research, Academy Fellowship of the Kerala Lalitha Kala Academy in 2005 for creative works, Pravasi Kalaratna Fellowship of Kerala Sangeetha Nataka Akademi in 2013 for painting. The Government of Kerala awarded him the 2014 Raja Ravi Verma Puraskaram, the highest state award in the art category, in 2015. National Gallery of Modern Art, Bangalore held the retrospective of six decades of work by Nambiar in February 2018, which was curated by Sadanand Menon 

He has been chairman of the Lalit Kala Academi, New Delhi, member of the General Council of Lalit Kala Academy, member of the Central Advisory Board on Culture, India.

Major works

 Monument to the Assassinated, Kota stone, steel and granite, 2.5 x 5.6 x 1.8 m., Goethe-Institut Max Mueller Bhavan, New Delhi, 1995
 Valampiri Shankha, stainless steel, 2.4 m. high, Indian Institute of Science, gifted by Texas Instruments, Bangalore, 2000
 Hanging sculpture, stainless steel, 5.3 m. high, ING-Vysya Bank, Bangalore, 2003
 Sculpture for Timken, stainless steel, 6.02 m. high, TIMKEN, Bangalore, 2004
 Kannati Bimbam, 2007
 The Sky is the Limit, stainless steel, 6.5 m. high, Indian Oil Corporation, New Delhi, 2010

Collections
 National Gallery of Modern Art, India (sculptures in National Gallery Modern Art, New Delhi; Government Museum, Bangalore; National Gallery of Modern Art, Bangalore; Jawahar Kala Kendra, Jaipur)
 Government Museum, Chennai
 Museum of Sacred Art, Durbuy, Belgium
 Jawaharlal Nehru Centre for Advanced Scientific Research, Bangalore
 Rietberg Museum, Zurich
See more in Shrishti Art Gallery, India.

Publications on ritual art
 Nambiar, Balan (2014). "Veeralipattu, Valampiri Shankha, Kannadi Bimbam". Kottayam, Kerala State, India: DC Books.  (Malayalam)
 
 Nambiar, Balan (2009). "Mythos und Kunsthandwerk (Rituals, myths and handicrafts)". In Beltz, Johannes. Wenn Masken tanzen – Rituelles Theater und Bronzekunst aus Südindien. Museum Rietberg, Zürich, pp. 19–55.  (German)
 Nambiar, Balan (2001). "Masks in the ritual arts of the west coast of southern India". In Malik, S.C. Man, Mind and Mask, IGNCA, New Delhi, pp. 267–271. 
 Nambiar, Balan (2000). "Teyyam, the Ritual Performing Arts of northern Kerala". In Goswamy, B.N. History of Science, Philosophy and Culture in Indian Civilization: Indian Art, pp. 265–277, New Delhi. 
 Nambiar, Balan (1993). "Tai paradevata: Ritual impersonation in the Teyyam tradition of Kerala". In Brückner H., Lutze L., Malik A. Flags of fame, Studies in South Asian folk culture, pp. 139–163, South Asia Books, 
 Nambiar, Balan., Fisher E. (1987) "Patola / Virali pattu – from Gujarat to Kerala". Lang, Peter, Asiatische Studien 41,2: 120–146, 1987 (German)
 Nambiar, Balan (1981). "Gods and Ghosts – Teyyam and Bhuta rituals". Doshi, Saryu (ed) The performing Arts, Marg Volume 34, Issues 3–4, Bombay, 1981, pp 62–73

References

External links

 Personal website
 Balan Nambiar Interview by Parul, Chandigarh Lalit Kala Academy

20th-century Indian painters
Indian male sculptors
Indian enamellers
20th-century enamellers
21st-century enamellers
Indian folklorists
Scholars from Kerala
Photography academics
People from Kannur district
Malayali people
Artists from Kerala
1937 births
Living people
Government College of Fine Arts, Chennai alumni
Modern sculptors
Jawaharlal Nehru Fellows
20th-century Indian sculptors
Indian contemporary artists
21st-century ceramists